Muhammad Bilal (born 24 September 1995) is Pakistani wrestler. He won bronze medal in 2018 Commonwealth Games. He won the match on a one-sided score of 6:1 in 57-kg freestyle wrestling competition. He is from Gujranwala.

Major results

References

Living people
People from Gujranwala District
Wrestlers at the 2014 Asian Games
Wrestlers at the 2018 Commonwealth Games
Pakistani male sport wrestlers
1995 births
Wrestlers at the 2018 Asian Games
Commonwealth Games medallists in wrestling
Commonwealth Games bronze medallists for Pakistan
Asian Games competitors for Pakistan
Sportspeople from Gujranwala
21st-century Pakistani people
Medallists at the 2018 Commonwealth Games